Opegrapha serusiauxii is a species of lichen in the family Opegraphaceae. It was described as a new species in 2008 by Robert Lücking. It is found in Ecuador, where it grows on leaves in the understorey of tropical rainforests. The specific epithet honours Belgian lichenologist Emmanuël Sérusiaux.

References

Arthoniomycetes
Lichen species
Lichens of Ecuador
Lichens described in 2008
Taxa named by Robert Lücking